Sunshine 99.9 (DYTA 99.9 MHz) is an FM station owned by Wave Network and operated by Local Community Outreach Philippines. Its studios and transmitter are located at 2nd Floor, TS Bldg., Villa Ruiz, Brgy. Marasbaras, Tacloban.

References

External links
Sunshine 99.9 FB Page
Sunshine 99.9 Website

Radio stations in Tacloban
Radio stations established in 2019